Ameen Hussain Jubran (born 1984) is a Yemeni chemist and the founder of Jeel Albena Association for Humanitarian Development. In 2021, he accepted a Nansen Refugee Award on behalf of the organisation.

Early life and education 
Jubran was born in Saada, Yemen in 1984 and studied chemistry at Sa'ada University.

Adult life 
In 2017, during the Yemeni Civil war, Jubran founded Jeel Albena Association for Humanitarian Development not-for-profit organization. The organization provides relief to displaced people in the form of emergency shelter, non-food assistance, and protection services.

During the war, Jubran was displaced by violence four times, and was narrowly missed by an airstrike in 2018.

Jubran accepted the Nansen Refugee Award in 2021, on behalf of Jeel Albena.

References 

Yemeni scientists
Organization founders
People from Saada Governorate
21st-century chemists

1984 births
Living people